An unofficial independence referendum was held in Nevis on 18 August 1977. It was organised by the Nevis Reformation Party and sought for island of Nevis to separate from St Kitts prior to independence and for remain within the British Empire as a separate Crown colony, similar to Anguilla, which had seceded from Saint Christopher-Nevis-Anguilla in 1967.

Although 99.66% voting in favour, the result was declared invalid by the national government.

Results

Aftermath
The constitution proclaimed at the independence of Saint Kitts and Nevis in 1983 contained Article 113, giving Nevis the right to unilaterally secede if a referendum resulted in a two-thirds majority. A 1998 referendum resulted in 62% voting in favour of independence.

References

Nevis
1977 in Saint Kitts-Nevis-Anguilla
Referendums in Saint Kitts and Nevis
Separatism in Saint Kitts and Nevis
Nevis
Election and referendum articles with incomplete results